The Franklin County School District is a public school district in Franklin County, Georgia, United States, based in Carnesville. It serves the communities of Canon, Carnesville, Franklin Springs, Gumlog, Lavonia, Martin, and Royston.

Schools
The Franklin County School District has three elementary schools, one middle school, and one high school.

Elementary schools
Carnesville Elementary School
Lavonia Elementary School
Royston Elementary School

Middle school
Franklin County Middle School

High school
Franklin County High School

References

External links

Red Hill School historical marker

School districts in Georgia (U.S. state)
Education in Franklin County, Georgia